"Get into You" is a dance-pop song written by Mike Percy and Tim Lever for Australian singer, songwriter and actress Dannii Minogue's second album, Get into You (1993). It was produced by Lever & Percy and received a mixed reception from music critics. Released as the fifth single in the second quarter of 1994, it reached the top forty in the United Kingdom. Along with the single "This Is It", the song was chosen to be released in Canada and the US.

Critical reception
In his weekly UK chart commentary, James Masterton wrote, "The new single is more of the kind of record she turns out as standard and has little prospect of reaching the heights of earlier releases." Alan Jones from Music Week said, "The title track from Minogue's last MCA album makes a belated appearance. And should radio warm to the Hustler's Convention's housed-up transformations of the track, already big in the clubs, Minogue could net another medium-sized hit." James Hamilton from the RM Dance Update described the remix as a "plaintive remorselessly powerful jiggly throbbing" track.

Music video
A music video was made to promote the single. It was later published on YouTube in August 2013.

Formats and track listings
These are the formats and track listings of major single releases of "Get into You".

 CD single
 "Get into You" (Original 7" Radio edit)
 "Get into You" (Hustlers Convention Disco Mix Radio edit)
 "Get into You" (Hustlers Convention Disco mix)
 "Get into You" (Arizona Club mix)
 "Get into You" (Hustlers Convention Disco dub)

 UK vinyl single
 "Get into You" (Hustlers Convention Disco mix)
 "Get into You" (Hustlers Convention Disco dub)
 "Get into You" (Arizona Club mix)
 "Be Careful" (Eric Kupper dub) Mislabelled as "Get into You" (Eric Kupper dub)

 Cassette single
 "Get into You" (Original 7" Radio edit)
 "Get into You" (Hustlers Convention Disco Mix Radio edit)

Charts

References

1994 singles
Dannii Minogue songs
Songs written by Tracy Ackerman
Songs written by Tim Lever
Songs written by Mike Percy (musician)
1993 songs
MCA Records singles
Mushroom Records singles